Dreamcar is the eponymous debut album by American band Dreamcar. It was released on May 12, 2017 through PLOF, LLC, a branch of Columbia Records. The album contained two singles, "Kill for Candy" and "All of the Dead Girls".

Singles 
The album's lead single, "Kill for Candy", was released on March 2, 2017. Along with the announcement of the album, promotional single "Born to Lie" was released on April 7 of the same year. The second promotional single, "All of the Dead Girls", was released on April 14.

Track listing 
All songs written by Tony Kanal, Adrian Young, Tom Dumont, and Davey Havok.

Personnel 
Credits taken from AllMusic.
 Davey Havok – lead vocals, composer 
 Tom Dumont – guitar, keyboards, backing vocals 
 Tony Kanal – bass, keyboards, backing vocals 
 Adrian Young – drums, percussion

Additional
 Scheila Gonzalez – saxophone 
 Adam Hawkins – engineering
 Duane Diebolt – illustrations
 Tina Ibañez – art direction, design
 Ted Jensen – mastering
 Peter Mack – engineering assistance
 Gabrial McNair – keyboards
 Tim Pagnotta – production
 Brian Phillips – engineering
 Mark "Spike" Stent – mixing
 Mark Williams – A&R
 Steve Erle – photography
 Michael Freeman – mixing assistance

Charts

References 

2017 debut albums
Columbia Records albums
Dreamcar albums